Gary P. Wolstenholme MBE (born 21 August 1960) is an English professional golfer, known for his long amateur career, who now plays on the European Senior Tour.

Wolstenholme was born in Egham, Surrey. His father was Guy Wolstenholme a professional golfer. He has won The Amateur Championship twice (1991, 2003) as well as many other amateur tournaments around the world. He has played on six Walker Cup teams and is the all-time points leader for the Great Britain and Ireland side.

In September 2008, at the age of 48, Wolstenholme turned professional in anticipation of playing senior professional golf in 2010. He attempted to qualify for the European Tour through qualifying school, but failed to advance past the first stage.

Playing on the European Senior Tour, Wolstenholme has won three events: the 2010 Casa Serena Open, 2012 Mallorca Open Senior and the 2012 Benahavis Senior Masters.

Amateur wins
1989 Golf Illustrated Gold Vase
1991 The Amateur Championship
1993 Chinese Amateur
1995 United Arab Emirates Amateur, British Mid-Amateur
1996 British Mid-Amateur, Finnish Amateur Championship, Berkshire Trophy
1997 Welsh Amateur, Berkshire Trophy
1998 British Mid-Amateur
2000 Sherry Cup Invitational
2001 Sherry Cup Invitational
2002 South African Amateur Stroke Play, Berkshire Trophy
2003 The Amateur Championship, Scottish Amateur Stroke Play Championship
2005 New South Wales Medal
2006 European Mid-Amateur
2007 European Mid-Amateur, New South Wales Amateur

Professional wins (5)

PGA EuroPro Tour wins (1)

European Senior Tour wins (3)

European Senior Tour playoff record (0–1)

Other senior wins (1)
2011 Handa Australian Senior Open

Results in major championships

Note: Wolstenholme never played in the PGA Championship.

CUT = missed the half-way cut

Team appearances
Amateur

 European Amateur Team Championship (representing England): 1995, 1997, 1999, 2001, 2003, 2005 (winners), 2007

Walker Cup (representing Great Britain & Ireland): 1995 (winners), 1997, 1999 (winners), 2001 (winners), 2003 (winners), 2005
St Andrews Trophy (representing Great Britain & Ireland): 1992 (winners), 1994 (winners), 1996 (winners), 1998, 2000 (winners), 2002 (winners), 2004 (winners)
Eisenhower Trophy (representing Great Britain & Ireland): 1996, 1998 (winners)
Eisenhower Trophy (representing England): 2002, 2004
Bonallack Trophy (representing Europe): 1998 (winners), 2000 (winners), 2004, 2006 (winners)

References

External links

2008 U.S. Open profile

English male golfers
European Senior Tour golfers
PGA Tour Champions golfers
Members of the Order of the British Empire
People from Egham
1960 births
Living people